The French Imperial Navy was the name given to the French Navy during the period of the Napoleonic Wars, and subsequently during the reign of Napoleon Bonaparte.  The first use of the title 'Imperial Navy' was in 1804, following the Coronation of Napoleon, a name derived from the old French Navy under The Republic. It notably saw action at the Battle of Trafalgar, and its defeat prevented Napoleon's planned invasion of the United Kingdom.  After the First Bourbon Restoration in 1814, the navy was renamed to its old title of French Royal Navy, but after Napoleon's return in March 1815, briefly became the Imperial Navy once more. Following the Second Bourbon Restoration, the navy once again became royal, and the title wasn't used again.

History

Fleet of the Restoration 
In 1789 the Kingdom of France had the second strongest navy in the world (only second to the Royal British Navy).  The navy had been rebuilt since the disasters of the Seven Years' War.  During the American War of Independence, (Anglo-French War (1778–1783)), the French managed quite a few successes against the British Royal Navy which could at best contain this new, rejuvenated, navy.  French naval officers had become more talented and one, Admiral Pierre André, Comte de Suffern, proved to be a brilliant opponent in the Indian Ocean (Second Anglo-Mysore War).  Following the Treaty of Paris in 1783, the French continued to make improvements to the navy that had brought them revenge for the defeats of the Seven Years' War.  The standard French ships of the line were of 74 guns (Third-rate designation) and were of excellent design.  Some reforms were made in 1782, which organised the French Navy in the most sweeping fashion since the days of Louis XIV.  The whole navy was divided into nine fleets (or squadrons) with many measures made for greater efficiency.

The way the French fleet was officered and manned was somewhat different to that of the Royal British Navy.  In the 1780s the officer corps was filled almost exclusively by the sons of noble families.  Indeed, to become a Student of the Navy (Elève de la Marine) (the equivalent of a Midshipman in the British Royal Navy), the young aspiring officer had to apply with a certified copy of his family genealogy to ensure that he had the required amount of 'blue blood'.  This system, which ensured officer positions for the nobility, nevertheless produced good officers since they were highly trained.  Its evil lay in the unfairness to qualified men condemned to the lower deck or the merchant marine because they were not of noble blood.  Because of this lacking hope, bitterness increased dramatically both in the army and the navy.

In 1789 the French navy had three main military seaports: Brest and Rochefort on the Atlantic, and Toulon on the Mediterranean.  These ports were the headquarters for senior commanders, and the bases for most Marine units.  They had large shipyards for the construction and refitting of warships, as well as related industries, and were the homes of thousands of ouvriers, the shipyard workers.  There was a powerful corps of administrative and technical officers such as commissars, shipbuilding engineers, and so on.  There were the officers of the pen (officiers de plume) as opposed to the officers of the sword (officiers d'épée), the sea-faring naval officers who had little regard and much disdain for the "paper pushers".  There were smaller bases in France, such as Lorient and Cherbourg, and also in the colonies, such as Fort Saint Louis in Martinique and Port Louis in Île-de-France, which were humbler versions of the three great ports, all with the same military and administrative structure.

Napoleon's reforms 
Napoleon has often been considered to misunderstand the navy.  Being an artillery officer, he was given to precise calculations and never quite accepted that the wind was more important to ships than his orders.  His impatience at his fleet at Boulogne is famous.  Much less known but just as important were his naïve pragmatic measures toward the fleet taken during 1800–1801.  In a general reform, a mass of individuals notable for their 'crass ignorance' were kicked out of the navy and the ranks opened to anyone with decent qualifications, including former officers of the Royal Navy, as well as educated and talented young men.  To improve discipline, the old pre-1789 general regulations were brought back into force and new ones drafted, bringing back order and submission to central authority.  The concept of having, besides the larger warships, armed small craft in 'flotillas' also evolved at this time and saw success against the British Channel Fleet in August 1801, frustrating Admiral Horatio Nelson himself.  Admiral Denis Decrès, an able administrator but unfortunately more of a courtier than a naval strategist, was made Minister of the Marine in 1801, a portfolio he held until the final exile of the Emperor in 1815 (see below).  Great efforts and vast sums of money were allotted to the navy by the First Consul.  The navy had 83 ships of the line in 1792, but only 46 ten years later, while the numbers of frigates had gone from 74 to 37.  To build new ships large military seaports and shipyards were set up at Cherbourg and Antwerp – the latter especially worried British Prime Minister William Pitt, who felt it was a 'pistol aimed at the head of England'.  For the first time in over a decade the navy emerged from chaos, thanks to Napoleon's measures.

However, a good navy takes many years to build, not only ships, but an ample reserve of skilled officers and sailors.  At first, Napoleon wrongly presumed that uniting the fleets of Spain and Holland to that of France would automatically produce a great fleet – like gathering the contingents for the Grande Armée.  Skilled manpower was always a problem for the fleet, which Napoleon tackled with increasingly military measures.  A first experiment had been the formation of the Légion Nautique during the French campaign in Egypt and Syria.  Following the defeat of the French fleet at Abukir, nearly 2,500 sailors and Marine artillerymen were stranded in Alexandria and used to form the new legion during October and November 1798.  Issued with arms and uniforms, the new legion had eight companies of fusiliers, one of grenadiers, and sections of artillery and pioneers.  General Bonaparte noted that the sailors could be trained and led quite efficiently in a militarised organisation.  He did not forget this.  The Légion Nautique was repatriated to France at British expense in September 1801, but disbanded after returning.  Many of the veterans of this legion would later serve in the famed Sailors of the Imperial Guard.

Trafalgar Campaign

Initial Plans & Changes 
Napoleon had been planning an invasion of England for some time, with the first Army of England gathering on the Channel coast in 1798. Napoleon's concentration on campaigns in Egypt and Austria, and the Peace of Amiens caused these plans to be shelved in 1802. The resumption of hostilities in 1803 led to their revival, and forces were gathered outside Boulogne in large military camps in preparation for the assembling of the invasion flotilla. The Royal Navy was the main obstacle to a successful invasion, but Napoleon declared that his fleet need only be masters of the Channel for six hours and the crossing could be effected. Though the intended departure points were known and were being closely blockaded by the Royal Navy, First Lord of the Admiralty Lord Melville was short of ships. If a combined Franco-Spanish fleet were to force the Navy from its station for even a short while, the French invasion force might succeed in crossing unmolested. The French aimed to achieve at least temporary control of the Channel, while the British aimed to prevent this at all costs.

Battle and Campaign 
Villeneuve's fleet underwent repairs in Cádiz, covered by a hastily assembled blockade of British warships, initially commanded by Rear-Admiral Cuthbert Collingwood, and from 27 September by Vice-Admiral Nelson, who had arrived from England to take command. He spent the following weeks preparing and refining his tactics for the anticipated battle and dining with his captains to ensure they understood his intentions. Nelson had devised a plan of attack that anticipated the allied fleet would form up in a traditional line of battle. Drawing on his own experience from the Nile and Copenhagen, and the examples of Duncan at Camperdown and Rodney at the Saintes, Nelson decided to split his fleet into squadrons rather than forming it into a similar line parallel to the enemy. These squadrons would then cut the enemy's line in a number of places, allowing a pell-mell battle to develop in which the British ships could overwhelm and destroy parts of their opponents' formation, before the unengaged enemy ships could come to their aid.

Napoleon, increasingly dissatisfied with Villeneuve's performance, ordered Vice-Admiral François Rosily to go to Cádiz and take command of the fleet, sail it into the Mediterranean to land troops at Naples, before making port at Toulon. Villeneuve decided to sail the fleet out before his successor arrived. On 20 October the fleet was sighted making its way out of harbour by patrolling British frigates, and Nelson was informed that they appeared to be headed to the west. Nelson led his column of ships into battle aboard HMS Victory, and succeeded in cutting the line and causing the pell-mell battle he desired to break out. After several hours of fighting 17 French and Spanish ships had been captured and another destroyed, without the loss of a single British ship. Nelson was among the 449 British dead, having been mortally wounded by a French sharpshooter during the battle. Nine of the prizes were later scuttled or sunk in a storm that blew up the following day. A sortie led by some of the ships that managed to escape under Julien Cosmao managed to recapture the Spanish Santa Ana, but in doing so he lost three more of his ships, wrecked in the gale, while a fourth was captured by the British, but later wrecked. The British fleet and the surviving French prizes put into Gibraltar over the next few days.

Aftermath 
By early November the combined fleet had been practically destroyed. Two ships of the line had been lost at Finisterre, twenty-one at Trafalgar and in the ensuing storm, and four at Cape Ortegal. No British ships had been lost in these engagements. Many of those that had survived in French or Spanish hands were badly damaged and would not be ready for service for some time. The British victory gave them unchallenged supremacy of the seas, securing British trade and sustaining the Empire.

After 1805 the morale of the French navy was destroyed, while its continued blockade in port robbed it of efficiency and will.  While Napoleon returned to the possibility of an invasion some years later, it was never with the same focus or determination. The failure of his navy to fulfil its objectives left him disillusioned, while the timidity of its commanders and the determination of the British to resist them, both factors clearly expressed at various stages throughout the Trafalgar campaign, left the navy with a lack of purpose and direction.

After Trafalgar 
Napoleon found himself with weak and demoralised remnants of a high-seas fleet and flotilla.  The Boulogne Flotilla crews had been organised into 14 Crews battalions on 10 August 1805.  This time, however, the flotilla was not disbanded and its better gunboats were used for coastal service, escorting convoys of small commercial vessels along the English Channel.   Some gunboats might be useful on the coast, but meant nothing against the powerful ships of the British Royal Navy.  Napoleon fully understood this and resolved to rebuild the fleet through a large long-term construction programme.  Vat sums of money were poured into the great military ports in order to build new ships of the line.

By 1811 the programme was running smoothly and six to seven ships of the line from 74 to 118 guns were launched every year until Napoleon abdicated in 1814.  The French fleet then had 81 ships of the line with 18 more under construction.  There were also about 100 frigates afloat or under construction at that date.  In time, given good leadership and opportunity, there is no doubt that this new fleet would have united and challenged the British Royal Navy.  Instead, many of these new ships were dispersed or destroyed by the allies as they occupied the French naval bases during the summer of 1814.  This third blow–the first had been the Revolution, the second Trafalgar–was to be fatal for the French navy.  Not until the second half of the 19th century would France have a powerful battle fleet again.

Ministers of the Marine

Organisation 
Because so many formations were formed and disbanded several times, effectively ad-hoc commands, only the permanent or long-lived formations are listed below:

Pre-Revolution 

History of the "Two Fleets System", and the reorganisations into squadrons here.

Squadrons 

 Atlantic Fleet – those squadrons attached to the old Atlantic Fleet
 Brest Squadron, at the Brest Arsenal, Brest
 Cherbourg Squadron, at the Cherbourg Arsenal, Cherbourg
 Escaut Squadron, at the Antwerp Arsenal, Antwerp
 Lorient Squadron, at the Lorient Arsenal, Lorient
 Rochefort Squadron, at the Rochefort Arsenal, Rochefort
 Mediterranean Fleet – those squadrons attached to the old Mediterranean Fleet
 Toulon Squadron, at the Toulon Arsenal, Toulon
 Aegean Sea Squadron, at Corfu, French Ionian Islands
 Overseas Fleet – those squadrons deployed Overseas to the colonies
 Windward Islands (West Indies) Squadron, at Fort Saint Louis, Martinique
 East Indies Ocean (East Indies) Squadron, in Pondichéry, French India

Naval Corps 

The 'Naval Corps' was the name given to the branch of the navy which oversaw the sailors, naval troops, and colonial troops.

List of ships 

 List of ships of the line of the First Empire
 List of frigates of the First Empire

Footnotes

Notes

Citations

References 

 
 
 
 
 
 
 
French Navy
Napoleonic Wars
Military units and formations established in 1804
Military units and formations established in 1815
Military units and formations disestablished in 1814
Military units and formations disestablished in 1815